is a Japanese professional boxer. He held the WBC interim bantamweight title from 2018 to 2019, and challenged for the full world title in 2019.

Professional career

He started boxing from a very young age, after watching his brother competing, winning several high school championships. After showing much promise as an amateur, Takuma made his pro debut in 2013, when he was barely 18 years old. His first opponent was future WBO Minimumweight World Champion Tatsuya Fukuhara (12-3). Even though he was outmatched, Inoue managed to pull off the upset and get the unanimous decision over the much more experienced boxer. That was his only fight in the light flyweight division. He immediately jumped to flyweight, facing a worthy foe in Teeraphong Utaida (25-2). Neither the fact that he moved up a weight class nor that he went from 6 to 8 rounds, scared the young Japanese prodigy. Once again, Takuma proved that he was a force to be reckoned with, going the distance and earning yet another victory. After knocking out a debuting Chalerm Kotala, Inoue outclassed world title contender Nestor Daniel Narvaes (20-2) at super flyweight, despite that being only his fourth fight.

He defeated Mark Anthony Geraldo to win the OPBF Super flyweight title. Takuma's sound skills and technique, earned him his first championship when he fought Mark Anthony Geraldo (31-6), for the vacant OPBF Super Flyweight title, in 2015. At the time, he was just 19 years old. Before the year was over, he successfully defended the belt against Rene Dacquel (15-5). In 2016, Takuma beat Filipino stand out Froilan Saludar (23-1*) at the Sky Arena in Japan, before moving up to bantamweight. Saludar managed to drop him early in the opening round but Inoue returned the favor in the later rounds. The Japanese fighter was set to face Marlon Tapales (29-2) for the WBO Bantamweight World Title on December of the same year. Unfortunately, bad luck stroke Inoue as he fractured his hand in training, thus withdrawing from his one and only world title fight to date. 
Inoue made his return in August 2017, in an epic war with 4-time world title challenger Hiroyuki Kudaka (25-16). Both men went back and forth for 10 rounds, exchanging shots and stealing the show. Takuma remained unbeaten and proved that he was back and stronger than ever. He went on to defeat former Japanese champion Kentaro Masuda (27-8) and Indonesian journeyman Waldo Sabu (12-11). Now back in the world title picture, his next fight could be the one he needs to finally compete for the big one.

WBC Eliminator

On September 11, Takuma Inoue squared off with Mark John Yap for an opportunity at the WBC Bantamweight World Championship. 
Takuma Inoue (11-0 / 3 KOs) is the younger brother of 3 division world champion, Naoya Inoue. Mark John Yap (29-12 / 14 KOs) is a veteran of the sport, who has been around for 11 years. Despite having lost 12 of his 41 fights, he has only been stopped twice, while his last recorded loss is back in 2014. 22-year-old Takuma Inoue is one win away from joining brother Naoya as a world champion after defeating Filipino veteran Mark John Yap to become the WBC bantamweight mandatory challenger. They were fairly neck-and-neck until Inoue floored Yap with a left hook in the fifth. From there, Inoue maintained control for the next three rounds and turned aside Yap's late onslaught, which came about when open scoring revealed that he needed a knockdown or knockout to win.

WBC Interim Championship

On 12/30, Takuma Inoue won vacant WBC Interim Title against Petch Sor Chitpattana in Ota City General Gymnasium Japan.
Petch Sor Chitpattana (48-0) holds the most impressive record in the entire division but it has been compiled at the expense of distinctly average opposition. Takuma Inoue's career has now hit a career-high after winning his first world-level title and has another big fight waiting in the wings. Inoue earned a unanimous decision (117-111, 117–111, 117–111) to win the interim WBC bantamweight title. The fight started off with Inoue landing the straight right hand effectively, causing a cut near Chitpattana's right eye. Throughout the first couple of rounds, Chitpattana's head movement was almost nonexistent, allowing Inoue to let his hands go and take control of the fight early. Chitpattana did manage to get back and starting landing punches, some to the body, but was still outmatched by Inoue. In the middle rounds, Inoue's punch output started to decrease and Chitpattana established his right hand to pressure Inoue. Late in the ninth round, Inoue, with his back against the ropes, landed a right hand that caught Chitpattana off-balance and Inoue finished the round with a flurry of shots. In the 10th round, Inoue landed a body shot that stunned Chitpattana, reclaiming the momentum that he had in the early rounds. Chitpattana tried to come back pressure forward to Inoue, looking to work the body, but Inoue proved to be too much for Chitpattana to handle. 
As the interim WBC champion, Inoue is also the mandatory challenger to the winner of the vacant WBC world title fight between Rau'Shee Warren and Nordine Oubaali. 
The WBC title was previously held by Luis Nery but was stripped of the belt after being missing weight before a title defense against Shinsuke Yamanaka earlier this year. After multiple attempts to stage a fight for the vacant title failed throughout the year, the WBC created an interim title despite still being no actual champion at the time.

WBC Bantamweight Championship

Nordine Oubaali vs Takuma Inoue

Inoue faced two time Olympian Nordine Oubaali on his 2nd Title defense on Thursday, November 7, 2019, on the undercard of Naoya Inoue vs Nonito Donaire on the World Boxing Super Series Bantamweight Final. The Saitama Super Arena will be packed to capacity for the proceedings as Oubaali brings the experience and power advantage to the table while Inoue looks to have the speed edge.

On fight night Nordine Oubaali drops and outpoints Takuma Inoue to retain his WBC title pounding out a unanimous decision (117-110, 120–107, 115–112).
Inoue (13-1, 3 KO) was pushed back in the third round by the stronger Oubaali (17-0, 12 KO), and then dropped with a big left hand in the fourth. At that point it really looked like the Frenchman would overpower the Japanese challenger, and be able to put him away within the next few rounds, after Inoue survived the fourth by moving and holding. Inoue never gave up on the fight, staying quite competitive and coming back very nicely after the knockdown and break between rounds. He gave a fine accounting of himself as a legitimately solid contender, and not just a guy who got a crack because his brother is famous.

For the 33-year-old Oubaali, he's established himself as one of the top fighters at 118 pounds, but he's at a point age-wise where he probably wants to unify soon if that's something that's on his agenda. A fight with Naoya Inoue, if he beats Nonito Donaire in the next fight on this card, would be a natural to make in Japan based on this result.

Inoue vs. Kurihara 
On 14 January, 2021, Inoue beat Keita Kurihara by technical decision in their 9 round contest. Kurihara was ranked #4 by the IBF at bantamweight at the time. The scorecards were announced as 82-89, 82-89, 81-90 in favor of Inoue.

Inoue vs. Wake 
In his next bout, Inoue beat Shingo Wake by unanimous decision on 11th November, 2021. Wake was ranked #13 by the WBO at super bantamweight. The scorecards read 117-110, 117-110, 117-110 in favor of Inoue.

Inoue vs. Furuhashi 
In his next bout, on 7th June, 2022, Inoue fought Gakuya Furuhashi. Inoue won the fight convincingly, winning 119-109, 120-108, 120-108 on the scorecards.

Inoue vs. Bornea 
On 13th December, 2022, Inoue returned to fight Jake Bornea. The fight was stopped in the 8th round due to a cut opened up on Bornea, with Inoue dominating the action up to that point.

Awards

Inoue was named the 2015 The Ring magazine Prospect of the Year.

Personal life

He is the younger brother of Naoya Inoue.

Professional boxing record

See also
List of bantamweight boxing champions
List of Japanese boxing world champions
Boxing in Japan

References

External links

Takuma Inoue - Profile, News Archive & Current Rankings at Box.Live

1995 births
Living people
Japanese male boxers
People from Zama, Kanagawa
Sportspeople from Kanagawa Prefecture
Super-flyweight boxers
Bantamweight boxers
Super-bantamweight boxers
21st-century Japanese people